Johan Rooryck (born July 1, 1961) is a Belgian linguist and a visiting professor at Leiden University where he was Professor of French Linguistics between 1993 and 2020.
He is the editor-in-chief of the journal Glossa and the former executive editor of Lingua (1999-2015).
Rooryck is known for his works on generative grammar.
He is the executive director of cOAlition S 
and is a recipient of Distinguished Lorentz Fellowship (2011/2012).

Books
 Dissolving Binding Theory, with Guido Vanden Wyngaerd, Oxford University Press 2011 
 Configurations of Sentential Complementation: Perspectives from Romance Languages, Routledge 2011
 Romance Languages and Linguistic Theory 1999, edited with Yves D’Hulst and Jan Schroten, John Benjamins Publishing Company 2001
 Quitte ou Double Sens: Articles sur l'Ambiguïté offerts à Ronald Landheer, edited with Paul J. Smith and Paul Bogaards, Brill Rodopi 2001
 Phrase Structure and the Lexicon, edited with Laurie Zaring, Springer 1996

References

External links
 Personal Website
 

Syntacticians
Living people
Academic staff of Leiden University
Linguists from Belgium
1961 births
KU Leuven alumni
Morphologists
Linguistics journal editors
Scientists from Leuven